Visual Science may refer to:
 Vision science, the scientific study of vision
 The study of optics, ophthalmology, and  optometry.
 Visual Sciences (game company), founded 1993
  Visual Sciences (formerly known as WebSideStory), founded 1996